Can't You Take a Joke? is the first studio album by Mucky Pup. The album was recorded at Fox Studios in Rutherford, New Jersey and released in 1988 through Torrid Records and Roadrunner Records.

Track listing
"Knock Knock" - 0:59
"Nazichizm" - 2:24
"Caddy Killer" - 0:47
"M.B. (Ballad of the Morron Bros.)" - 2:47
"Innocent's" - 2:29
"Daddy's Boy (Theme Song)" - 1:01
"F.U.C.K." - 1:19
"U-R Nothing" - 1:00
"A.I.D.S." - 2:48
"Life 4 Def" - 1:54
"Laughing in Your Face" - 2:10
"Woody" - 1:48
"Bushpigs" - 1:38
"Mr. Prezident" - 2:01
"I.R.S." - 1:08
"Shmbluh" - 1:49

Credits
 Chris Milnes - lead vocalist 
 John Milnes - drummer
 Dan Nastasi - guitarist 
 Scott LePage - bassist

Production
Design – Deborah Lauren
Engineer – Bill (The Catt) Klatt
Executive-Producer – Ken Adams, Todd Gordon
Lyrics By – Mucky Pup 
Music By – Mucky Pup
Photography By – Brian Downing, Brian Newman, Chris Milnes, Mark Hart
Photography By (Front Cover) – Brian Downing
Producer – C. Milnes, S. LePage

References

1988 debut albums
Mucky Pup albums